Eulithidium umbilicatum is a species of small sea snail with calcareous opercula, a marine gastropod mollusk in the family Phasianellidae, the pheasant snails.

Distribution
This species occurs in the Pacific Ocean off Peru and Chile.

References

External links
 To World Register of Marine Species

Phasianellidae
Gastropods described in 1840